Habo is a locality and the seat of Habo Municipality, Jönköping County, Sweden with 12,216 inhabitants in 2019.  Habo Church is located circa 4 kilometres to the southwest.

References

External links

 
Populated places in Habo Municipality
Municipal seats of Jönköping County
Swedish municipal seats